Elections to Armagh City and District Council were held on 5 May 2005 on the same day as the other Northern Irish local government elections. The election used four district electoral areas to elect a total of 22 councillors.

Election results

Note: "Votes" are the first preference votes.

Districts summary

|- class="unsortable" align="centre"
!rowspan=2 align="left"|Ward
! % 
!Cllrs
! % 
!Cllrs
! %
!Cllrs
! %
!Cllrs
! % 
!Cllrs
!rowspan=2|TotalCllrs
|- class="unsortable" align="center"
!colspan=2 bgcolor="" | DUP
!colspan=2 bgcolor="" | SDLP
!colspan=2 bgcolor="" | Sinn Féin
!colspan=2 bgcolor="" | UUP
!colspan=2 bgcolor="white"| Others
|-
|align="left"|Armagh City
|16.0
|1
|27.6
|2
|bgcolor="#008800"|32.3
|bgcolor="#008800"|2
|14.8
|1
|9.3
|0
|6
|-
|align="left"|Crossmore
|15.0
|1
|33.3
|2
|bgcolor="#008800"|38.5
|bgcolor="#008800"|2
|13.2
|0
|0.0
|0
|5
|-
|align="left"|Cusher
|bgcolor="#D46A4C"|47.7
|bgcolor="#D46A4C"|3
|9.8
|1
|8.1
|0
|30.3
|2
|4.1
|0
|6
|-
|align="left"|The Orchard
|bgcolor="#D46A4C"|33.9
|bgcolor="#D46A4C"|1
|17.6
|1
|18.5
|1
|30.0
|2
|0.0
|0
|5
|- class="unsortable" class="sortbottom" style="background:#C9C9C9"
|align="left"| Total
|29.6
|6
|21.2
|6
|23.1
|5
|22.7
|5
|3.4
|0
|22
|-
|}

District results

Armagh City

2001: 2 x Sinn Féin, 2 x SDLP, 1 x DUP, 1 x UUP
2005: 2 x Sinn Féin, 2 x SDLP, 1 x DUP, 1 x UUP
2001-2005 Change: No change

Crossmore

2001: 2 x Sinn Féin, 2 x SDLP, 1 x UUP
2005: 2 x Sinn Féin, 2 x SDLP, 1 x DUP
2001-2005 Change: DUP gain from UUP

Cusher

2001: 3 x UUP, 2 x DUP, 1 x SDLP
2005: 3 x DUP, 2 x UUP, 1 x SDLP
2001-2005 Change: DUP gain from UUP

The Orchard

2001: 2 x UUP, 1 x DUP, 1 x Sinn Féin, 1 x SDLP
2005: 2 x UUP, 1 x DUP, 1 x Sinn Féin, 1 x SDLP
2001-2005 Change: No change

References

Armagh City and District Council elections
Armagh